Alasora is a rural commune in Analamanga Region, in the  Central Highlands of Madagascar. It belongs to the district of Antananarivo Avaradrano.

It is located in the East of Antananarivo. The sacred Hill of Alasora is situated in this municipality.

Economy
Most important economic factor is agriculture.   Alasora is also known to be a place where pottery and earthenware is made.

References

External links

Populated places in Analamanga